The 2014 Swiss Indoors was a men's tennis tournament played on indoor hard courts. It was the 45th edition of the event known as the Swiss Indoors, and part of the 500 series of the 2014 ATP World Tour. It was held at the St. Jakobshalle in Basel, Switzerland, from 20 October through 26 October 2014. First-seeded Roger Federer won the singles title.

Points and prize money

Point distribution

Prize money

Singles main-draw entrants

Seeds

 Rankings are as of October 13, 2014

Other entrants
The following players received wildcards into the singles main draw:
  Marco Chiudinelli
  Borna Ćorić
  Alexander Zverev

The following players received entry from the qualifying draw:
  Simone Bolelli
  Kenny de Schepper
  Gastão Elias
  Pierre-Hugues Herbert

Withdrawals
Before the tournament
  Julien Benneteau
  Juan Martín del Potro
  Nick Kyrgios

Retirements
  Mikhail Kukushkin (shoulder injury)

Doubles main-draw entrants

Seeds

 Rankings are as of October 13, 2014

Other entrants
The following pairs received wildcards into the doubles main draw:
  Marco Chiudinelli /  Michael Lammer
  Sandro Ehrat /  Henri Laaksonen
The following pair received entry from the qualifying draw:
  Colin Fleming /  Jonathan Marray

Finals

Singles

  Roger Federer defeated  David Goffin, 6–2, 6–2

Doubles

  Vasek Pospisil /  Nenad Zimonjić defeated  Marin Draganja /  Henri Kontinen, 7–6(15–13), 1–6, [10–5]

References

External links
Official website

2014 ATP World Tour
2014
2014 in Swiss tennis